IWP may refer to:

International Wildbird Photographer Awards, annual competition
GSM Interworking Profile (DECT), mobile telecomms standard
International Workers Party, an American psychoanalytic-Marxist organization founded 1974
Internationalist Workers Party (Fourth International) a Morenoist group in the US
Interview Waiver Program, a program where some nonimmigrant visa applicants to the United States can have the visa interview requirement waived
The Institute of World Politics, graduate school in Washington DC, USA
Indo-West Pacific, zoogeographical region
Inside Washington Publishers, American publisher
International Writing Program, nonprofit arts residency in Iowa City, IA, USA